Shūsuke, Shusuke or Shuusuke (written: 修介, 秀介, 秋介 or 周輔) is a masculine Japanese given name. Notable people with the name include:

, Japanese filmmaker and screenwriter
, Japanese activist
, Japanese footballer
, former Japanese footballer
, Japanese footballer

Japanese masculine given names